Marta Camps-Arbestain, usually known as Marta Camps, is a New Zealand soil science academic, and a full professor at Massey University.

Academic career

After a 1995 PhD titled  'Selenium partitioning in the soil-plant-atmosphere system'  at the University of California, Davis, Camps Arbestain moved to University of Santiago de Compostela and then Massey University, rising to full professor.

Selected works 
 Joseph, S. D., Marta Camps-Arbestain, Yun Lin, P. Munroe, C. H. Chia, J. Hook, L. Van Zwieten et al. "An investigation into the reactions of biochar in soil." Soil Research 48, no. 7 (2010): 501–515.
 Herath, H. M. S. K., Marta Camps-Arbestain, and Mike Hedley. "Effect of biochar on soil physical properties in two contrasting soils: an Alfisol and an Andisol." Geoderma 209 (2013): 188–197.
 Wang, Tao, Marta Camps-Arbestain, Mike Hedley, and Peter Bishop. "Predicting phosphorus bioavailability from high-ash biochars." Plant and Soil 357, no. 1-2 (2012): 173–187.
 Okeke, Benedict C., Tariq Siddique, Marta Camps Arbestain, and William T. Frankenberger. "Biodegradation of γ-hexachlorocyclohexane (lindane) and α-hexachlorocyclohexane in water and a soil slurry by a Pandoraea species." Journal of agricultural and food chemistry 50, no. 9 (2002): 2548–2555.

References

Living people
New Zealand women academics
Year of birth missing (living people)
University of California, Davis alumni
Academic staff of the Massey University
New Zealand soil scientists
Academic staff of the University of Santiago de Compostela
New Zealand women writers